Josi is a given name. Notable people with the given name include:

Josi S. Kilpack (born 1974), American novelist
Josi W. Konski, Cuban-born American film producer
Josi Meier (1926–2006), Swiss politician and feminist
 Josef "Josi" Singer (1923–2009), Israeli President of Technion – Israel Institute of Technology

See also
Josi, surname